The Miss Wisconsin Teen USA competition is the pageant that selects the representative for the state of Wisconsin in the Miss Teen USA pageant.

Wisconsin has placed at Miss Teen-USA on six occasions. The first placement was in 1984, when Adrianne Hazelwood made the ten semi-finalists, and then endured an eighteen-year dry spell until Vanessa Semrow won the Miss Teen USA crown in 2002. Then lastly with two consecutive semi-final placements with Katherine (Kate) Patrice Redeker (2013) and Patience Ann Vallier (2014), followed by Shreya Gundelly in 2021 and her sister Sage Gundelly in 2022.

Five Wisconsin teen titleholders have competed at Miss USA, (four as Miss Wisconsin-USA in 1995, 2014, 2010, and 2016; and one as Miss Connecticut USA in 1985). One teen, Maria Kim, has also competed at Miss America in 1987 and won two talent awards. In 2007, Bishara Abridasheed Dorre, Miss Wisconsin Teen-USA 2006, became the first former Miss Teen-USA state titleholder to win a Miss America's Outstanding Teen state title, when she was crowned Miss Wisconsin's Outstanding Teen 2007.

Sage Gundelly of Mequon was crowned Miss Wisconsin Teen USA 2022 on May 8, 2022 at Madison Marriott West Hotel in Middleton. She will represent Wisconsin for the title of Miss Teen USA 2022.

Results summary

Placements
Miss Teen USA: Vanessa Marie Semrow (2002)
Top 10: Adrianne Hazelwood (1984)
Top 15: Patience Ann Vallier  (2014)
Top 16: Katherine Patrice Redeker (2013), Shreya Gundelly (2021), Sage Gundelly (2022)
Wisconsin holds a record of 6 placements at Miss Teen-USA.

Winners 

1 Age at the time of the Miss Teen USA pageant

References

External links
Official website

Wisconsin
Women in Wisconsin